Skylink or Sky Link may refer to:

Broadcasting and telecommunications
 Skylink (TV platform), Czech–Slovak satellite platform
 Sky Link (Russia), LTE-450 operator
 Sky Link TV, Chinese satellite TV station

Transportation
 Skylink (bus service), a British bus service
 Skylink Airways, later known as MAXjet Airways, an American airline
 SkyLink Arabia, a Dubai-based airline
 SkyLink Aviation, a Canadian airline
 Delta SkyLinks, online branding once used by Delta Air Lines
 DFW Skylink, an inter-terminal transportation system

See also
 Chamberlain Group, Inc. v. Skylink Technologies, Inc., a 2004 American legal case
 Skylink, an earlier name for the Austrian Star Alliance Terminal at Vienna International Airport
 Skylynx (disambiguation)